The position of Professor of Mathematical Finance in the Mathematical Institute of the University of Oxford was established in 2002.
 It is one of the six Statutory professorships in  Mathematics at Oxford.
From 2005 to 2015, the position was designated as 'Nomura Chair of Mathematical Finance' and endowed by Nomura. 
The post is associated with a professorial fellowship at St. Hugh's College, Oxford.

List of Professors of Mathematical Finance

The holders of the Chair have been:

XunYu Zhou, 2008-2016.

Rama Cont, 2018-

References

See also
List of professorships at the University of Oxford

Mathematics education in the United Kingdom
Mathematics
Professorships in mathematics
Lists of people associated with the University of Oxford
Statutory Professors of the University of Oxford